Opisthocentra is a monotypic genus of flowering plants belonging to the family Melastomataceae. The only species is Opisthocentra clidemioides.

Its native range is Colombia to Venezuela and Northern Brazil.

References

Melastomataceae
Melastomataceae genera
Monotypic Myrtales genera